The discography of Apathy, an underground rapper from Connecticut, USA. He released several studio albums, EP's and mixtapes.

Albums

Studio albums

Instrumental Album

Compilations

Mixtapes

EPs

Collaborations

Guest appearances

Production discography

Music Videos

See also
Army of the Pharaohs discography
Get Busy Committee discography

References

Hip hop discographies
Discographies of American artists